Ransom Knowling (24 June 1912 – 22 October 1967) was an American rhythm and blues musician, best known for playing bass on many blues recordings made in Chicago between the 1930s and 1950s, including those of Arthur Crudup and Little Brother Montgomery.

He was born in New Orleans, Louisiana, and began playing professionally around 1930 in the New Orleans bands led by Sidney Desvigne and Joe Robichaux.  As well as bass, he played violin and tuba.  By the late 1930s, he had moved to Chicago, and played on many of the blues records made in the city, including those by the Harlem Hamfats, Big Bill Broonzy, Roosevelt Sykes, Washboard Sam, Sonny Boy Williamson, T-Bone Walker, Tommy McClennan, and Muddy Waters. He played on Arthur Crudup's "That's All Right", recorded in 1946.

He died in Chicago in 1967, aged 55.

Discography

With Muddy Waters
The Real Folk Blues (Chess, 1947-64 [1966])
With Otis Spann
The Blues of Otis Spann (Decca, 1964)

References

1912 births
1967 deaths
Blues musicians from New Orleans
20th-century American musicians
20th-century African-American musicians